Neoregelia correia-araujoi is a species of flowering plant in the genus Neoregelia. This species is endemic to Brazil.

Cultivars
 Neoregelia 'Afropop'
 Neoregelia 'Kiko'
 Neoregelia 'Spring Rain'
 Neoregelia 'Vallenato'

References

BSI Cultivar Registry Retrieved 11 October 2009

correia-araujoi
Flora of Brazil